Macedonia or macédoine is a salad composed of small pieces of fruit or vegetables. Fruit Macedonia is a fresh fruit salad and is a common dessert in Greece, Romania, Spain, France, Italy and South America. Vegetable Macedonia or Macédoine de légumes nowadays is usually a cold salad or hors d'oeuvre of diced vegetables, in France often including red beans. Macédoine de légumes is also a hot vegetable dish consisting of the same vegetables served with butter. Prepared macédoine, a mixture of diced vegetables and often peas, is often sold canned or frozen. It is sometimes mixed with mayonnaise combined with aspic stock, making it similar to Russian salad.

Etymology

The word macedonia was popularised in the middle of the 18th century to refer to mixed fruit salad. This probably alludes to the diverse origin of the people of Alexander's Macedonian Empire, but that is "not fully established". It is sometimes said that it refers to the ethnic mixture in 19th century Ottoman Macedonia, but this is not possible, since it is first attested in 1740. Starting later in the 18th century, macedoine could mean any medley of unrelated things, not necessarily edible.

See also
 List of culinary knife cuts
 List of salads

References

Salads
Desserts
Fruit salads